Chief Engraver of the Royal Mint is a senior position at the British Royal Mint who is responsible for overseeing the preparation of coin dies.

List of chief engravers

References

Bibliography

Ceremonial officers in the United Kingdom